Arthur Wheatley was Provost of St Andrew's Cathedral, Inverness from 1980 to 1983

Wheatley was born in 1931, educated at Edinburgh Theological College  and ordained in 1970. After a curacy at St Salvador, Dundee he held incumbencies in Lossiemouth and Elgin until his appointment as Provost.

Notes

1931 births
Alumni of Edinburgh Theological College
Provosts of Inverness Cathedral
Living people